

Brihthelm or Beorhthelm (died between 957 and 959) was a medieval Bishop of London.

Brihthelm was consecrated between 951 and 953 and he died between 957 and 959.

Citations

References

 

Bishops of London
10th-century English bishops
950s deaths
Year of birth unknown